David Wilson (born May 25, 1966) is a Canadian former figure skater who currently works as a choreographer at the Toronto Cricket and Skating Club.

As a skater, his competitive career was cut short when he was diagnosed with Osgood-Schlatter disease. Following surgery on his knee, then 18-year-old Wilson toured with Ice Capades in North America.

With his then-partner, Jean-Pierre Boulais, Wilson settled in Montreal and began working as a choreographer. Their breakout client was Sébastien Britten.

Later, Wilson moved to Toronto and worked with many notable skaters including World and Olympic champions and medalists.

Choreographing career
His current and former clients include: 

 Jeremy Abbott
 Miki Ando
 Jordan Brauninger
 Sébastien Britten
 Jeffrey Buttle
 Patrick Chan
 Sasha Cohen
 Alissa Czisny
 Frédéric Dambier
 Caydee Denney & Jeremy Barrett
 Michaela Du Toit
 Jessica Dubé & Bryce Davison
 Marie-France Dubreuil & Patrice Lauzon
 Javier Fernández
 Ben Ferreira
 Christina Gao
 Geng Bingwa 
 Alexe Gilles
 Yuzuru Hanyu
 Lesley Hawker
 Emily Hughes
 Sara Hurtado & Adrià Díaz
 Lubov Iliushechkina & Dylan Moscovitch
 Midori Ito
 Jin Boyang
 Brian Joubert
 Rika Kihira
 Yuna Kim
 Takahiko Kozuka
 Kwak Min-jeong
 Cha Jun-hwan
 Kiira Korpi
 Anabelle Langlois & Cody Hay
 Amélie Lacoste
 Jacinthe Larivière & Lenny Faustino
 Li Zijun
 Liu Yan 
 Christopher Mabee
 Evgenia Medvedeva
 Kimmie Meissner
 Mai Mihara
 Jessica Miller & Ian Moram
 Daisuke Murakami
 Kensuke Nakaniwa
 Yukari Nakano
 Nam Nguyen
 Nobunari Oda
 Yoshie Onda
 Brian Orser
 Pang Qing & Tong Jian
 Peng Cheng & Jin Yang
 Park So-youn
 Cynthia Phaneuf
 Adam Rippon
 Joannie Rochette
 Roman Sadovsky
 Gabrielle Daleman
 Kaori Sakamoto
 Aliona Savchenko & Robin Szolkowy
 Shawn Sawyer
 Netta Schreiber
 Fumie Suguri
 Sui Wenjing & Cong Han
 Daisuke Takahashi
 Denis Ten
 Jeremy Ten
 Elizaveta Tuktamysheva
 Shoma Uno
 Ashley Wagner
 Johnny Weir
 Lauren Wilson
 Nicholas Young
 Yu Xiaoyu & Jin Yang
 Agnes Zawadzki
 Caroline Zhang
 Zhang He 
 Zhang Kexin
 Tessa Virtue & Scott Moir

References

Living people
Figure skaters from Toronto
Canadian male figure skaters
Canadian figure skating coaches
Figure skating choreographers
Canadian LGBT sportspeople
Gay sportsmen
LGBT figure skaters
1966 births
21st-century Canadian LGBT people
Canadian gay men